Teresa Catlin (born 13 February 1969) is a British former professional tennis player. She is still active in senior tennis and in 2020 was named 'Women's Senior Player of the Year' by the Lawn Tennis Association.

Catlin, a Cambridge-based player, reached a career high singles ranking of 214 on the professional tour, in a career which included main draw appearance at the Australian Open and Wimbledon.

On the WTA Tour, Catlin's best performances were making the second round at both Auckland and Wellington in 1988, withs wins over Pam Casale and Monique Javer respectively.

ITF finals

Singles: 1 (0–1)

References

External links
 
 

1969 births
Living people
British female tennis players
English female tennis players
Tennis people from Cambridgeshire